Glory Hole Dwarven Mine is a 1981 role-playing game adventure published by Judges Guild.

Plot summary
Glory Hole Dwarven Mine is an adventure in which several parties, including the player characters, are simultaneously entering a large dwarven mine soon after the dwarves encountered decimating demonic intrusions.

Publication history
Glory Hole Dwarven Mine was written by Edward R.G. Mortimer, and was published by Judges Guild in 1981 as a 48-page book.

Reception
Lewis Pulsipher reviewed Glory Hole Dwarven Mine in The Space Gamer No. 54. Pulsipher commented that "This was a decent idea, for the most part, but inadequately produced."

References

Judges Guild fantasy role-playing game adventures
Role-playing game supplements introduced in 1981